Erymanthus is a genus of checkered beetles in the subfamily Clerinae.

References 

 Gerstmeier R and Salvamoser M. 2014: Revision of the checkered beetle genus Erymanthus Spinola, 1841 (Coleoptera, Cleridae, Clerinae). Zootaxa 3755(6), pages 501–548,

External links 
 
 

Clerinae
Cleridae genera